Dormitator lebretonis is a species of fish in the family Eleotridae found in the Eastern Atlantic from Senegal to the Kunene River in Namibia.

References

Harrison, I.J., P.J. Miller and F. Pezold, 2003. Eleotridae. p. 670-690 In C. Lévêque, D. Paugy and G.G. Teugels (eds.) Faune des poissons d'eaux douce et saumâtres de l'Afrique de l'Ouest, Tome 2. Coll. Faune et Flore tropicales 40. Musée Royal de l'Afrique Centrale, Tervuren, Belgique, Museum National d'Histoire Naturalle, Paris, France and Institut de Recherche pour le Développement, Paris, France. 815 p.

lebretonis
Taxa named by Franz Steindachner
Fish described in 1870